GCIC may refer to:
Global City Innovative College a private college in Taguig City, Philippines.
Global Cyberspace Integration Center a field operating agency of the United States Air Force.